The 2011 Kurume Best Amenity International Women's Tennis is a professional tennis tournament played on carpet courts. It is part of the 2011 ITF Women's Circuit. It took place in Kurume, Japan in 9 and 15 May 2011.

Singles entrants

Seeds

 Rankings are as of May 2, 2010.

Other entrants
The following players received wildcards into the singles main draw:
  Yumi Miyazaki
  Emi Mutaguchi
  Aiko Nakamura
  Yumi Nakano

The following players received entry from the qualifying draw:
  Chinami Ogi
  Akiko Omae
  Varatchaya Wongteanchai
  Akiko Yonemura

The following players received entry by a lucky loser spot:
  Akari Inoue
  Hirono Watanabe

Champions

Singles

 Rika Fujiwara def.  Monique Adamczak, 6–3, 6–1

Doubles

 Ayumi Oka /  Akiko Yonemura def.  Rika Fujiwara /  Tamarine Tanasugarn 6–3, 5–7, [10–8]

External links
Official Website
ITF Search

Kurume Best Amenity International Women's Tennis
Carpet court tennis tournaments
Kurume Best Amenity Cup
2011 in Japanese tennis